Grisha S. Heyliger-Marten (born 28 July 1976) is a politician from Sint Maarten. She is currently President of the Parliament of Sint Maarten as a member of the United People's Party.

She was first elected to the Parliament of Sint Maarten in the 2020 general election.

References 

1976 births
Living people
Presidents of the Parliament of Sint Maarten
Members of the Parliament of Sint Maarten
United People's Party (Sint Maarten) politicians
Sint Maarten women in politics
21st-century Dutch women politicians
21st-century Dutch politicians
Florida Memorial University